The following is a complete list of episodes for the British sitcom Keeping Up Appearances. The programme premiered on BBC One on 29 October 1990 and ran for five series, with its final episode airing on 25 December 1995. The programme consists of 44 episodes, including four Christmas specials.

Overview

Episodes

Series 1 (1990)
The first series was broadcast on Monday nights at 8:30 pm.

Series 2 (1991)
The second series was broadcast on Sunday nights at 7:15 pm. The 1991 Christmas special was broadcast on Wednesday night at 8:50 pm.

Series 3 (1992)
The third series was broadcast on Sunday nights at 7:15 pm.

Series 4 (1993–94)
The fourth series and the 1993 Christmas special (Boxing Day) was broadcast on Sunday nights at 7:00 pm. The 1994 Christmas special was broadcast on Sunday evening at 5:25 pm.

Series 5 (1995)
The fifth series was broadcast on Sunday nights at 8:30 pm. The 1995 Christmas special was broadcast on Monday night at 8:00 pm.

Other media

Children in Need
A short special was produced for Children in Need and broadcast on 24 November 1995.

Compilation
Two compilation specials were produced; the first, "The Memoirs of Hyacinth Bucket", was broadcast on 20 March 1997 and sees Daisy discovers a manuscript of Hyacinth's memoirs amongst some things she loaned her, prompting Daisy and Onslow to look back at some of the funniest moments from the show. The second, "Life Lessons from Onslow", was released exclusively on DVD in the United States via BBC Video on 9 September 2008. It sees Onslow present lessons for life when hosting an Open University programme, by showing various moments from the Keeping Up Appearances show. All the favourites are here in an hour-long retrospective.

Young Hyacinth

A prequel episode was broadcast on BBC One on 2 September 2016 in which it is set in the early 1950s and a young Hyacinth Walton (Kerry Howard) is seen desperately trying to force her family to climb the ever-expanding social ladder. It was watched by 4.39 million viewers.

Notes
The Warner Home Video 10 disc Collector's Edition DVD box set mislabels series 5 episodes 6-10 as series 6 episodes in the United States.

The Series Three and Four Boxset did not include the 1993 and 1994 Christmas specials. These were released with the 2006 boxset. A complete collection was released on 8 October 2007.

References

External links

BBC-related lists
Lists of British sitcom episodes

sr:Списак ликова Keeping Up Appearances